Çımışkı is a village in the Gölpazarı District, Bilecik Province, Turkey. Its population is 30 (2021).

References

Villages in Gölpazarı District